Jouko Viitamäki (born January 29, 1949 in Hämeenlinna) is a Finnish sprint canoer who competed in the late 1960s. He was eliminated in the semifinals of the K-1 1000 m event at the 1968 Summer Olympics in Mexico City.

References
Sports-reference.com profile

1949 births
Living people
People from Hämeenlinna
Canoeists at the 1968 Summer Olympics
Finnish male canoeists
Olympic canoeists of Finland
Sportspeople from Kanta-Häme